Nichols  (also known as James Garner as Nichols) is an American Western television series starring James Garner. It was first broadcast in the United States on NBC during the 1971–72 season. Set in the fictional town of Nichols, Arizona, Nichols differed from traditional Western series. The time period was 1914, at the beginning of the motorized era and well after the decline of the "Old West". The main character, a sheriff also named Nichols, rode on a motorcycle and in an automobile rather than on the traditional horse. Nichols did not carry a firearm and was generally opposed to the use of violence to solve problems, preferring other means. Margot Kidder played his love interest, a barmaid named Ruth.

Although Nichols' first name was never spoken aloud, his army induction papers, seen in the opening moments of the pilot episode, gave "Frank" as his first name (also the first name of series creator Frank Pierson).

Premise
After 18 years in the army, Nichols decides to quit after the introduction of a new, deadlier type of machine gun. He comes back to the town founded by his family to learn that it has been taken over by another family, the Ketchams. At the end of the pilot episode, matriarch Ma Ketcham (Neva Patterson) blackmails Nichols into serving as the town sheriff, a position which carries little actual authority but considerable danger. Nichols' personal concern is not usually law enforcement but rather finding a way to get rich with very little effort.

Ma Ketcham's oldest son, known simply as "Ketcham" and played by John Beck, is constantly butting heads with Nichols. The role of Ketcham was greatly reduced after the first few episodes. Toward the end of the first season, Beck, still a series regular, appeared in two episodes in the completely unrelated role of Orv, who gets Nichols into trouble with his schemes. In effect, Beck was playing a double role, but only Nichols and Mitch mention his resemblance to Ketcham in the first of the two episodes.

Mitch Mitchell, played by Stuart Margolin (who would later team with Garner again on The Rockford Files and Bret Maverick). is assigned to be Nichols' deputy, either in spite of or because he is none too bright, none too honest and something of a bully. Nichols' girlfriend Ruth (Margot Kidder), whom he meets after his return to town, is a barmaid at Salter's Hotel.

Behind-the-scenes
Nichols marked the first time since Maverick that Garner had worked with Warner Bros. After suing Warner over Maverick, Garner was banned from the lot by Jack Warner.

Garner wore three different hats in the main with his costumes during the course of the series: a cavalry hat, a striped cap for riding motorcycles, and finally an approximate duplicate of his black cowboy Maverick hat.  One episode, "Fight of the Century," was more or less a remake of the second half of the Maverick episode "Stampede," with Garner trying to persuade a genial animal-loving giant into fighting a professional in a boxing match, then winding up having to replace the reluctant giant and fight the boxer himself.  The primary difference between the two fights was that Garner, now more than a dozen years older, wore a nightshirt while boxing in the Nichols version.

The series did not do well in the ratings and was quickly retitled James Garner as Nichols in October 1971 to capitalize on the star's popularity. The low ratings also resulted in the decision by the program's producers to kill off the title character in the final episode to retool the series.  The unarmed Nichols was shot down, to be avenged by his identical twin brother, Jim Nichols (also portrayed by Garner), who arrived in town with precisely the same haircut and sideburns but wearing a vigorous mustache.  Jim administered justice in a somewhat more conventional (and it was hoped, popular) Western fashion, was offered the job of sheriff by Ma Ketcham, then rode out of town on a motorcycle, saying he expected he might come back sometime. This solution made recasting and retitling the program unnecessary while allowing for considerable changes, and leaving the door open for a second season.  However this episode proved to be the final one; before it aired NBC cancelled the series, rerunning the earlier episodes in the summer of 1972.  (One previously pre-empted episode featuring the original Nichols was also run in the summer.)  Garner offered an alternate version in his Archive of American Television interview, stating that once the series was canceled, Garner insisted on killing the lead character in the series' last episode so that there could never be a revival.

When interviewed for Emmy TV Legends, Garner indicated that Nichols was one of his favorite roles. In the interview he indicated that the failure of the show was due to a presentation of the show to executives at Chevrolet. The car company had originally offered to sponsor the show in full but, after the screening of the pilot, a wife of one of the executives complained that Nichols was not Maverick, the popular series that Garner starred in from 1957 to 1961.  As a result, Chevrolet indicated they would only sponsor half the show forcing Garner, Warner and NBC to hunt for other sponsors in a very competitive market.

Garner said that, despite the low ratings of the series, Nichols had better ratings than any show launched the following season on NBC and that the ratings for the series steadily improved which gave Garner, Warner and his producers hope that the show would be renewed.

Garner discovered Stuart Margolin, his frequent co-star on this series and The Rockford Files, while watching an episode of the anthology comedy series Love American Style. He also promoted his agent Meta Rosenberg to the role of producer for the series. She would continue to work as a producer for Garner's The Rockford Files as well.  Juanita Bartlett, frequent writer for The Rockford Files and screenplay writer of the Garner TV-movie The New Maverick, also began her career on Nichols.

While the motion picture The Americanization of Emily (1963), written by Paddy Chayefsky, remained Garner's favorite of his own work, he often noted that Nichols was his favorite of his several television series.

Cast
 James Garner as Frank Nichols/Jim Nichols
 Margot Kidder as Ruth
 Neva Patterson as Sara "Ma" Ketcham
 John Beck as Ketcham/Orv
 Stuart Margolin as Deputy Sheriff Mitch Mitchell

Recurring characters:
 John Harding as Salter, owner of Salter's Bar (10 episodes)
 James Lee Reeves as Fearless (8 episodes) 
 Luis Delgado as Luis (7 episodes, 3 uncredited)
 M. Emmet Walsh as Gabe McCutcheon (6 episodes)
 Barbara Collentine as Charlotte, the telegraph operator (6 episodes)
 Stefan Gierasch as Doc Bernstein (5 episodes)
 Richard Bull as Thatcher (5 episodes)
 James Beach as Bob Sanders (4 episodes)
 William Christopher as Niles (4 episodes)
 William Paterson as Perkins, the town banker (4 episodes)
 Paul Hampton as Johnson, a con artist and thief (3 episodes)
 Alice Ghostley as Bertha, owner of a rival tavern to Salter's (2 episodes)

Episodes

 
* The 10th episode titled "Bertha" with guest star Alice Ghostley was telecast on NBC on November 18, 1971, instead of the originally scheduled episode "Away the Rolling River."  "Bertha" was the last episode in the program's Thursday time slot.

Home media
On September 10, 2013, Warner Bros. released Nichols: The Complete Series on DVD in Region 1 via their Warner Archive Collection. This is a manufacture-on-demand release, available exclusively in the US and only through Warner's online store.

Syndication
Nichols was broadcast on American Forces Network Television in Germany in the early 1980s.
"Nichols" was also broadcast in Iran, specifically in Isfahan, during 1978.
"Nichols" is currently broadcast on the GetTV
network.

References

Brooks, Tim and Marsh, Earle, The Complete Directory to Prime Time Network and Cable TV Shows

External links
  
 

1971 American television series debuts
1972 American television series endings
NBC original programming
Television series by Warner Bros. Television Studios
Television shows set in Arizona
1970s Western (genre) television series